Yukitaka is a masculine Japanese given name.

Possible writings
Yukitaka can be written using different combinations of kanji characters. Here are some examples: 

幸隆, "happiness, noble"
幸孝, "happiness, filial piety"
幸喬, "happiness, high"
幸高, "happiness, tall"
幸貴, "happiness, precious"
行隆, "to go, noble"
行孝, "to go, filial piety"
行貴, "to go, precious"
之隆, "of, noble"
之貴, "of, precious"
志孝, "determination, filial piety"
志貴, "determination, precious"
志尭, "determination, high"
恭隆, "respectful, noble"
雪尭, "snow, high"

The name can also be written in hiragana ゆきたか or katakana ユキタカ.

Notable people with the name

, Japanese samurai
, Japanese footballer
, Japanese daimyō

Japanese masculine given names